The Soviet Union men's national water polo team represented the Soviet Union in international water polo competitions. After the dissolution of the Soviet Union, the Russian national water polo team became the successor of the Soviet team.

Results

Olympic Games

1952 — 7th place
1956 —  Bronze medal
1960 —  Silver medal
1964 —  Bronze medal
1968 —  Silver medal
1972 —  Gold medal
1976 — 8th place
1980 —  Gold medal
1984 — Qualified but withdrew
1988 —  Bronze medal

World Championship

1973 –  Silver medal
1975 –  Gold medal
1978 – 4th place
1982 –  Gold medal
1986 –  Bronze medal
1991 – 7th place

FINA World Cup

 1979 – 4th place
 1981 –  Gold medal
 1983 –  Gold medal
 1985 – Did not participate
 1987 –  Silver medal
 1989 – 6th place
 1991 – 5th place

Player statistics

Most appearances
100+

Top scorers
200+

See also
 Soviet Union men's Olympic water polo team records and statistics
 List of Olympic champions in men's water polo
 List of men's Olympic water polo tournament records and statistics
 List of world champions in men's water polo

References

Men's national water polo teams
Water sports in the Soviet Union
Men's sport in the Soviet Union